Tracktown is a 2016 American drama and coming of age sports film directed and written by Alexi Pappas and Jeremy Teicher and starring Pappas, Chase Offerle, Rachel Dratch and Andy Buckley. Filming took place in Eugene, Oregon. Tracktown premiered at the Los Angeles Film Festival in June 2016 and its worldwide release was on the 12 May 2017.

Plot
Twenty-one-year-old Plumb Marigold (Pappas) is a famous but lonely distance runner and has lived her entire life surrounded by coaches, teammates and fans while training to be an Olympic distance runner. Though she excels in her sport, she's always felt like an outsider, as her schedule has kept a normal life at bay. Everything changes when Plumb is ordered to take a day off from running to recover for the finals of the Olympic trials. Her forced downtime, including a surprise connection with a boy who works at the bakery, sets her on a new path.

Cast
Alexi Pappas as Plumb Marigold
Chase Offerle as Sawyer
Rachel Dratch as Gail, Plumb's mother
Andy Buckley as Burt, Plumb's father
Rebecca Friday as Whitney
Sasha Spencer as Coach
Remy Teicher as Jenny
Nick Symmonds as Nick 
Kristina Haddad as Sports Doctor
Chris Berman as Sports Announcer
Berenice Odriozola as Manicurist

Production
The producers of Tracktown are Laura Wagner, Jay Smith, Alexi Pappas and Jeremy Teicher.

Production was facilitated by the Sundance Institute's Creative Producing Lab Program and the San Francisco Film Society.

Production was assisted by interns from the University of Oregon.

Filming
Filming took place in Eugene, Oregon (known as TrackTown USA). including at Hayward Field.

Release
Tracktown premiered at the Los Angeles Film Festival in June 2016, was screened at the RiverRun International Film Festival in April 2017, and had its worldwide release on the 12 May 2017.

It was also part of the Official Section for the 2016 Thessaloniki International Film Festival, the 2017 Annapolis Film Festival, the 2017 Sunscreen Film Festival, and the Green Mountain Film Festival.

Critical response
Tracktown was met with mixed to positive reviews. Variety's Peter Debruge wrote that "What the film lacks in originality, it makes up for via its star's naturally glamor-resistant sensibility, giving us an unpolished glimpse into the personal life of a professional runner." Andy Webster of The New York Times wrote that "Fact and fiction blend nicely in Tracktown, the modest, appealing feature debut of Alexi Pappas." It holds a 71% rating on Rotten Tomatoes.

References

External links
 
  
 
 

2016 films
American track and field films
American sports drama films
American independent films
2010s sports drama films
American coming-of-age drama films
Films set in Oregon
Films shot in Eugene, Oregon
Films about Olympic track and field
Films about the Summer Olympics
2016 directorial debut films
2010s English-language films
2010s American films